Annegret Weller-Schneider (born 11 July 1930) is a Chilean sprinter. She competed in the women's 200 metres at the 1948 Summer Olympics. She also completed at those Olympics as part of Chile's 4 × 100 m team.

References

External links
 

1930 births
Living people
Athletes (track and field) at the 1948 Summer Olympics
Chilean female sprinters
Olympic athletes of Chile
Place of birth missing (living people)
Olympic female sprinters
20th-century Chilean women